The 1874 Cambridgeshire by-election was fought on 3 January 1874.  The byelection was fought due to the Succession to a peerage of the incumbent MP of the Conservative Party, Viscount Royston.  It was won by the Conservative candidate Elliot Yorke who was unopposed.

References

1874 in England
1874 elections in the United Kingdom
By-elections to the Parliament of the United Kingdom in Cambridgeshire constituencies
Unopposed by-elections to the Parliament of the United Kingdom in English constituencies
19th century in Cambridgeshire